Mount Agad-Agad is a mountain located in Iligan City in the Philippines which has an estimated height  above sea level.

Mount Agad-Agad is very accessible and is good for mountain hiking and overnight camping. It affords a full view of Iligan City by night or day. A small waterfall is featured on the way to the top of the mountain.

Agad-Agad
Landforms of Lanao del Norte
Tourist attractions in Lanao del Norte